Jenny Mucchi-Wiegmann (1 December 1895 in Spandau – 2 July 1969 in Berlin), also known as Genni Mucchi, was a German sculptor who worked primarily with terracotta and bronze. Her work has been exhibited at the Exposition Internationale des Arts et Techniques dans la Vie Moderne, the Venice Biennale, and the National Gallery in Berlin.

References 

1895 births
1969 deaths
20th-century German sculptors
20th-century German women artists
Artists from Berlin
German women sculptors
People from Spandau